6000 km di paura, internationally released as Safari Rally, is a 1978 action-thriller film directed by Bitto Albertini.

Cast 
 Marcel Bozzuffi: Paul Stark 
 Olga Bisera: Sandra Stark 
 Joe Dallesandro: Joe Massi 
 Eleonora Giorgi: Lucile Davis 
 Enzo Fiermonte

References

External links

Safari Rally at Variety Distribution

1978 films
Italian action thriller films
1970s action thriller films
Italian auto racing films
Films directed by Bitto Albertini
Films scored by Carlo Rustichelli
1970s Italian films